The Olympus PEN-F is a mirrorless interchangeable-lens camera in the Micro Four Thirds system, released in 2016. It is the part of the digital PEN series. The PEN-F pays tribute to the similarly named PEN F half-frame 35mm film SLR camera from 1963.

The PEN-F was the first Olympus camera to feature the new, 20 megapixel Four Thirds sensor, which made Micro Four Thirds more competitive on the market. This sensor later found its way into the OM-D series as well, featured in professional cameras like the E-M1 Mark III.

The PEN-F had an electronic viewfinder, which was a new feature in the digital PEN range, and it is still the only PEN camera to have it.

It has 10 frames per second continuous shooting and its fastest shutter speed is 1/8000 sec, it has focus peaking to assist manual focus, and built in Wi-Fi for connection to smartphone or tablet. Its rear LCD is a fully articulated "swivel" rear touch screen with a 1.04 million pixel resolution. The PEN-F comes in two colour schemes: black, or silver.

Design 

The PEN-F's name and design pays tribute to Olympus's legendary half-frame analog SLR, the PEN F from 1963. It has the same font for the model name on the front of the camera and has a chunky dial on the grip. On the old PEN F, that controls the shutter speed, on the new PEN-F, it is dedicated for changing the art filters. On the new PEN-F there are two customizable dials on the top for changing the shutter speed, or basically anything it has been set to. The overall shape of the cameras are quite similar, they both are rectangle boxes with an asymmetrical "stair" on the top. The completely flat grip is also a similar property of the two cameras. However, the new PEN-F can be extended with an optional, external grip, the ECG-4.

Specifications 
20MP Live MOS Four Thirds format sensor
1/8000 sec top mechanical shutter speed (1/16,000 with e-shutter)
5-axis image stabilisation with panning detection
ISO 80 – 25,600
Burst rate: Up to 10 fps continuous shooting (20 fps with electronic shutter)
Focus-peaking to assist manual focus
Intervalometer and Time Lapse movie creation (up to 99 frames)
Fully articulating 1.04 million dot, 3" LCD touchscreen
Built-in Wi-Fi for remote shooting (full control of all settings), image transfer and adding geolocation through smartphone
2.36 million dot OLED electronic viewfinder
Highly customizable interface, twin controls
50MP High-res Shot mode
1080/60p video recording

Compared to the Olympus OM-D E-M5 Mark II 
The PEN-F was sold side-by-side with the Olympus OM-D E-M5 Mark II and shared a lot of its features. The PEN-F started on 1,199$, the E-M5 Mark II cost 100$ less.

 The most obvious difference is the design: The E-M5 is designed after the Olympus OM SLR with the bump on the top, the PEN-F has an almost flat top, which makes it 1.3 centimeter shorter. The E-M5 Mark II has a more ergonomic grip compared to the PEN-F's flat one. 
 However, that bump comes with an advantage: The E-M5 Mark II has a bigger viewfinder magnification, than the PEN-F (0.72x vs 0.62x). The resolution of the EVF is the same though.
 The PEN-F has the new 20 MP sensor, which has a 25% higher resolution than the 16 MP sensor of the E-M5 Mark II, and despite its higher pixel density, it maintains the ISO performance and the dynamic range of the old sensor. The higher native resolution means that the sensor-shift high resolution mode produces 50 MP pictures instead of 40 MP.
 The E-M5 Mark II is weather sealed, the PEN-F is not.
 The E-M5 has a microphone 3.5mm jack connector, the PEN-F does not.

The features that are shared between the two cameras:

 5-axis sensor stabilization system
 Four Thirds sensor size
 Fully articulated rear LCD screen
 10 fps burst rate
 81 contrast-detection autofocus points
 10 fps burst rate
 1080p 60 fps max. video recording resolution and frame rate
 support for UHS-II SD cards

References

PEN-F
Cameras introduced in 2016